Renaldo Wellington (born 3 March 1999) is a Jamaican football defender who plays for Harbour View F.C.

Career

Club
Has played locally for Montego Bay United F.C.

In 2021, Wellington transferred to Harbour View F.C.

International
Wellington was capped by Jamaica for the March 2021 USA friendly in Austria.

References

1999 births
Living people
Jamaican footballers
Jamaica international footballers
Montego Bay United F.C. players
Association football defenders